Maximino Alejandro Fernández Ávila (30 April 1968 – 25 August 2020) is a Mexican politician affiliated with the Ecologist Green Party of Mexico. He served as Deputy of the LIX Legislature of the Mexican Congress as a plurinominal representative.

Personal life
Fernández came from a political family. His grandfather, was a Governor of Puebla. Both of his brothers, Justo and Manuel, are involved in Xalapa local politics.

Fernández died in Mexico City on 25 August 2020.

References

1968 births
2020 deaths
Politicians from Mexico City
Members of the Chamber of Deputies (Mexico)
Ecologist Green Party of Mexico politicians
Members of the Congress of Mexico City
Deputies of the LIX Legislature of Mexico